Stella Adams (April 24, 1883 – September 17, 1961) was an American actress of the silent and early sound film eras. Her forte was in short films.

Early years
Adams was born in Sherman, Texas.

Career
Although Adams appeared in only 12 feature films, she acted in almost 150 shorts during the silent era, mostly in starring or featured roles. Her first acting credit was one of those feature films, 1909's In the Sultan's Power, in which she had a starring role. The film was remarkable because it was the first film shot entirely on the west coast of the United States. At this point in the film industry, most films were still shot in New Jersey and New York.

Adams joined the Nestor Film Company in 1912 and moved to California when the company relocated there. Her early work was in comedies, but she also started working in Westerns. She left Nestor with director Al Christie when he began his own studio.

In 1917, an article in the trade publication Billboard reported that Adams left California "to join her husband in Chicago, and will next year return to the elegitimate stage."

Twenty years passed before Adams made another feature film, when she appeared in a featured role in the silent/sound film, Me, Gangster, directed by Raoul Walsh. Over the next eight years, Adams made another ten films, although in smaller and smaller roles, retiring in 1936.

Personal life
Adams was married to press agent James Whittendale.

Death
Adams died in Woodland Hills, California, on September 17, 1961, and was interred in Calvary Cemetery in Los Angeles.

Selected filmography (shorts & featured films)

(Per AFI database)

 In the Sultan's Power  (1909)
 Could You Blame Her   (1914)
 When Bess Got in Wrong (1914) as Stella
 His Nobs the Duke   (1915)
 Wanted: A Leading Lady (1915)
 Where the Heather Blooms (1915)
 Love and a Savage (1915)
 Mingling Spirits (1916)
 Me, Gangster  (1928)  
 Sister to Judas (1932)
 Temptation's Workshop  (1932)   
 The Vampire Bat  (1933)   
 Bachelor Mother  (1933)   
 Sing Sinner Sing  (1933)   
 The Whirlwind  (1933)   
 Whom the Gods Destroy  (1934)   
 The Tonto Kid  (1935)   
 The King Steps Out  (1936)   
 Theodora Goes Wild  (1936)

Notes

References

External links
 
 

1883 births
1961 deaths
People from Sherman, Texas
Actresses from Texas
American silent film actresses
American film actresses
20th-century American actresses
Burials at Calvary Cemetery (Los Angeles)